Italy has participated in the Eurovision Song Contest 47 times since making its debut at the first contest in . It was one of the seven countries that competed at the first contest, which took inspiration from the Sanremo Music Festival. Italy competed at the contest without interruption until , discontinuing its participation on a number of occasions during the 1980s and 1990s. Italy has won the contest three times, along with an additional 15 top-five finishes. Italy hosted the contest in Naples, Rome and Turin.

In , Domenico Modugno finished third with the song "Nel blu, dipinto di blu". Renamed "Volare", the song became a huge international hit, topping the US Billboard Hot 100 and winning two Grammy Awards at its first edition. Italy then finished third in 1975 with Wess and Dori Ghezzi and the song "Era". After 1997, Italy withdrew from the competition.

On 31 December 2010, the European Broadcasting Union (EBU) announced that Italy would be returning to the contest as part of the "Big Five", thereby granting the country automatic qualification for the final. Italy's return to the contest has proved to be successful, finishing in the top ten in nine of the last eleven contests (2011–22), including second places for Raphael Gualazzi and Mahmood, and third place for Il Volo. Il Volo won the televote, receiving votes from all countries, but came sixth with the juries. This was the first time since the introduction of the mixed jury–televote system in 2009 that the televote winner did not end up winning the contest.

History

Absences 
Italy has withdrawn from the Eurovision Song Contest a number of times. Italy again withdrew in  when RAI decided not to enter the contest.

None of the 20th century Eurovision-winning songs were particularly successful in the Italian charts. "Non ho l'età" by Gigliola Cinquetti was a hit in February 1964 when the song won the 1964 contest, but according to the official "Hit Parade Italia" website, "Waterloo", "Ding-a-dong", "Puppet on a String", "Save Your Kisses for Me" and even Italy's own winning entry of 1990, "Insieme: 1992", all failed to enter the top ten of the records sales charts. A notable exception to this rule was the 1984 entry "I treni di Tozeur" by Alice and Franco Battiato, which shared 5th place in the final, but still became a #3 hit in Italy and also placed at #20 on the chart of the best-selling Italian singles in 1984.

TV censorship of the 1974 contest 
RAI refused to broadcast the  because their competing song, sung by Gigliola Cinquetti, coincided with the intense political campaigning for the 1974 Italian divorce referendum which was to be held a month later in May. Despite the Eurovision Song Contest taking place more than a month before the planned vote, Italian censors refused to allow the contest and song to be shown or heard. RAI censors felt that the song, titled "Sì" (Yes), and contained lyrics constantly repeating the aforementioned word could be subject to accusation of being subliminal messaging and a form of propaganda to influence the Italian voting public to vote 'yes' in the referendum (thus to repeal the law that allowed divorce). The song thus remained censored on most Italian state TV and radio stations for over a month. At the contest in Brighton, Cinquetti finished second, losing to ABBA. "Sì" went on to be a UK top ten hit, peaking at number eight. It also reached the German top 20.

The 2008–2010 period 
In 2008, two notable Italian musicians, Vince Tempera (who was the conductor for Malta in 1975 and had helped San Marino take part in the ESC in 2008) and Eurovision winner Toto Cutugno expressed their sorrow at Italy's non-participation and called for the country to return to the contest.

Che fortuna, hosted by Raffaella Carrà on Rai Uno. Whether this was an initiative by Carrà (who presented three shows in TVE concerning the event) to try to bring Eurovision back to Italy is not clear, but Sietse Bakker, then-Manager Communications & PR of the Eurovision Song Contest, reiterated that "Italy is still very much welcome to take part in the competition."

Successful return (2011–present) 
At a press conference presenting the fourth edition of the Italian X Factor, Rai 2 director Massimo Liofredi announced that the winner of the competition might advance to represent Italy in the Eurovision Song Contest, rather than participate in the Sanremo Festival, as in previous years. On 2 December 2010, it was officially announced by the EBU that Italy had applied to compete in the 2011 contest. Their participation was further confirmed on 31 December with the announcement of the official participant list.

Italy's return to the contest after a 13-year absence has been successful, finishing in the top ten in nine of the last eleven contests (2011–22). In 2011, Raphael Gualazzi finished second, then Italy's best result since 1990. Italy came first with the jury vote, but only 11th in the televote to place second overall behind eventual winner Azerbaijan. Nina Zilli in 2012 and Marco Mengoni in 2013 placed in the top ten (ninth and seventh, respectively); the latter scored 126 points, exactly doubling the points total of the other "Big Five" countries that year. This trend had a stop in 2014, when internally-selected Emma Marrone finished in 21st place. In 2015, Il Volo finished third with 292 points, behind winner Sweden and runner-up Russia, placing first in the televote but sixth in the jury vote. Since the introduction of the 50/50 split voting system, this was the first time that the televote winner did not win the contest overall. Francesca Michielin, selected among the competitors of Sanremo 2016 after the waiver of the winners Stadio, ended in 16th place. Francesco Gabbani, a fan-favourite with "Occidentali's Karma", came in sixth place in 2017. The year after, although not initially a big favourite with the bookmakers, Ermal Meta and Fabrizio Moro returned Italy to the top five with "Non mi avete fatto niente", aided significantly by finishing third in the televote, which heavily counterbalanced the 17th place by the jury, finishing fifth overall. In 2019, Mahmood with "Soldi" placed second with 472 points, Italy's best result since 2011, until Måneskin with "Zitti e buoni" won the contest in 2021 with 524 points. Måneskin's victory marked the band's breakthrough on the international music scene. Mahmood returned in 2022 as the host entrant alongside Blanco, placing sixth with "Brividi".

Sanremo Music Festival 

The Sanremo Music Festival is the most popular Italian song contest and awards ceremony, held annually in the city of Sanremo, Liguria. First held in 1951 and itself the basis and inspiration for the Eurovision Song Contest, the festival has often been used as a method of choosing the Italian entry for the European contest, with some exceptions over the years. Since 2015, the winner of the festival has been given the right of first refusal to represent Italy in the contest.

Italy and the "Big Five" 
These countries earned this special status by being the four biggest financial contributors to the EBU, and subsequently became known as the "Big Four". In a meeting with OGAE Serbia in 2007, then-Executive Supervisor of the Contest Svante Stockselius stated that, if Italy were to return to the contest in the future, the country would also automatically qualify for the final, becoming part of a "Big Five". However, with the official announcement of the return of Italy, it was not confirmed whether the country would compete in one of the two semi-finals or be part of the "Big Five", as RAI, third largest contributor to the EBU, had not applied for "Big Five" membership.

Italy is currently the most successful Big Five country in the Eurovision Song Contest following the introduction of the rule, finishing in the top ten in nine of the last eleven contests (2011–22), including a victory for Måneskin, second places for Raphael Gualazzi and Mahmood, and third place for Il Volo.

Participation overview

Congratulations: 50 Years of the Eurovision Song Contest

Hostings

Awards

Marcel Bezençon Awards

Winner by OGAE members

Related involvement

Conductors

Heads of delegation

Commentators and spokespersons

Other shows

Photogallery

See also
Italy in the Junior Eurovision Song Contest – Junior version of the Eurovision Song Contest.
Italy in the Eurovision Young Dancers – A competition organised by the EBU for younger dancers aged between 16 and 21.
Italy in the Eurovision Young Musicians – A competition organised by the EBU for musicians aged 18 years and younger.

Notes and references

Notes

References

External links
 Italian Eurovision Website
 Esc-Time.com – Italian website daily updated about Eurovision
 Points to and from Italy (until 2015) eurovisioncovers.co.uk
 

 
Music competitions in Italy
Countries in the Eurovision Song Contest